Aung Thet Mann (born 19 June 1977), also known as Shwe Mann Ko Ko, is a Burmese businessman and currently CEO of Ayer Shwe Wah, a major Burmese company. Aung Thet Mann's father is Shwe Mann, a former military general and Speaker of the Pyithu Hluttaw. He graduated from the Yangon Institute of Economics. Aung Thet Mann is married to Khin Hnin Thandar.

References

Burmese businesspeople
1977 births
Living people